Adam Ariel (born December 10, 1994) is an Israeli-German professional basketball player for Hapoel Tel Aviv of the Israeli Basketball Premier League.

Early life
Ariel was born in Jerusalem and played for the Hapoel Jerusalem youth team.

Professional career

In 2012, Ariel joined the Hapoel Jerusalem senior team where he played three seasons. In his third year, he won the 2015 Israeli League Championship.

On July 7, 2015, Ariel signed with German club Eisbären Bremerhaven for the 2015–16 season under head coach Muli Katzurin. On January 6, 2016, Ariel parted ways with Bremerhaven to join Hapoel Holon for the remainder of the season.

On July 12, 2016, Ariel signed with Maccabi Ashdod for the 2016–17 season. On July 24, 2017, Ariel signed a one-year contract extension with Ashdod, becoming the team's captain. In 31 games played during the 2017-18 season, he averaged 6.8 points, 2.9 rebounds and 1 assist per game, shooting 41 percent from three-point range. Ariel helped Ashdod reach the 2018 Israeli League Playoffs, where they were eliminated by Hapoel Tel Aviv in the Quarterfinals.

On July 3, 2018, Ariel signed a two-year deal with Maccabi Rishon LeZion. On May 13, 2019, Ariel recorded a season-high 19 points, shooting 5-of-6 from three-point range, in a 102–105 loss to Hapoel Holon. Ariel won the 2018 Israeli League Cup title with Rishon LeZion, as well as reaching the 2019 Israeli League Finals, where they eventually fell short to Maccabi Tel Aviv.

On November 29, 2019, Ariel recorded 15 points, including a game-winner three-pointer with 0.6 seconds left to give Rishon LeZion a 77–74 win over Hapoel Tel Aviv. On February 3, 2020, Ariel recorded a career-high 21 points in an 80–72 win over Hapoel Be'er Sheva.

In August 2020, Ariel signed a one-year contract to return to Jerusalem. In July 2021, Ariel signed a two-year extension with the club, and two months later was named the team's captain. In 2020-21 he was second in the Israel Basketball Premier League in three-point field goal percentage (46.2 per cent).

In August 2022, Ariel signed with Hapoel Tel Aviv.

National team career
Ariel is a member of the Israel national basketball team. On September 13, 2018, he made his first appearance for the Israeli team in an 80–85 loss against Georgia, recording nine points and five rebounds off the bench.

Ariel was also a member of the Israeli Under-18 and Under-20 national teams.

See also
Sports in Israel

References

External links
 RealGM Profile
 FIBA profile

1994 births
Living people
Eisbären Bremerhaven players
German men's basketball players
Hapoel Holon players
Hapoel Jerusalem B.C. players
Hapoel Tel Aviv B.C. players
Israeli men's basketball players
Maccabi Ashdod B.C. players
Maccabi Rishon LeZion basketball players
Shooting guards
Small forwards
Sportspeople from Jerusalem